Nuria Ortiz (born 19 April 1945) is a Mexican former sports shooter. She competed at the 1968, 1972, 1984 and the 1988 Summer Olympics. Along with Eulalia Rolińska (Poland) and Gladys Baldwin (Peru) she was one of three women to compete in the shooting events at the 1968 Olympics.

References

1945 births
Living people
Mexican female sport shooters
Olympic shooters of Mexico
Shooters at the 1968 Summer Olympics
Shooters at the 1972 Summer Olympics
Shooters at the 1984 Summer Olympics
Shooters at the 1988 Summer Olympics
Place of birth missing (living people)
20th-century Mexican women